Elemental chlorine free (ECF) is a technique that uses chlorine dioxide for the bleaching of wood pulp. It does not use elemental chlorine gas during the bleaching process and prevents the formation of dioxins and dioxin-like compounds, carcinogens.  The traditional ECF sequence is DEopDEpD using the common letter symbols for bleaching stages, though many improved sequences are available.

Totally chlorine free (TCF) is paper that does not use any chlorine compounds for wood pulp bleaching.

See also
 Environmental issues with paper

References

External links
 Alliance for Environmental Technology - ECF: The Sustainable Technology

Paper